Karl Antonovich Ollo was a Russian figure skater.

Karl Ollo was a three-time champion of Russia in men's single skating (in 1910, 1911, and 1912) and the 1905 bronze medalist.

He lost his life at the front in the First World War.

Competitive highlights

References

External links 
 Karl Ollo at Fskate.ru

Year of birth missing
Year of death missing
Russian male single skaters
Figure skaters from Saint Petersburg